Shaun Chen  (born September 18, 1980) is a Canadian politician who was elected to represent the riding of Scarborough North in the House of Commons of Canada in the 2015 Canadian federal election. Chen was a trustee representing ward 21 in the Toronto District School Board as well as Board Chair but resigned on August 5, 2015, to run as the federal Liberal candidate for the newly established Scarborough North riding.

Chen was re-elected in the 2019 and 2021 Canadian federal elections with increasing shares of the vote.

Personal life
Chen was born in Toronto to Hakka Chinese parents from India. He was raised in Scarborough, Ontario. He is an alumnus of Sir John A. Macdonald Collegiate Institute and the University of Toronto. Chen was awarded both the Ontario Medal for Young Volunteers and Queen Elizabeth II Diamond Jubilee Medal in 1999 and 2013 respectively.

Electoral record

References

External links

Living people
Liberal Party of Canada MPs
Members of the House of Commons of Canada from Ontario
Toronto District School Board trustees
University of Toronto alumni
People from Scarborough, Toronto
Politicians from Toronto
21st-century Canadian politicians
Canadian politicians of Chinese descent
Canadian politicians of Indian descent
Hakka politicians
1980 births